Byron Kokkalanis (born 19 August 1985 in Athens), also spelled Vyron, is a Greek windsurfer of partly Filipino ancestry. He started sailing in 1997 in the Mistral class and 3 years later he won the Mistral Junior World Championship, his first international regatta. He took the fifth place at the 2016 Summer Olympics and the sixth place at the 2012 London Olympic Games. At the 2020 Tokyo Olympic Games he finished in the 11th place.

He was also fifth at the 2012 RS:X World Championships., third at the 2013 RS:X World Championship, first at the 2013 RS:X European Championship.

References

External links
 
 
 
 

1985 births
Living people
Greek windsurfers
Sailors (sport) from Athens
Sailors at the 2012 Summer Olympics – RS:X
Sailors at the 2016 Summer Olympics – RS:X
Olympic sailors of Greece
Greek male sailors (sport)
Sailors at the 2020 Summer Olympics – RS:X